Pentachlorobenzene (PeCB) is a chemical compound with the molecular formula C6HCl5 which is a chlorinated aromatic hydrocarbon.  It consists of a benzene ring substituted with five chlorine atoms.  PeCB was once used industrially for a variety of uses, but because of environmental concerns there are currently no large scale uses of PeCB. Pentachlorobenzene is a known persistent organic pollutant (POP) and banned globally by the Stockholm Convention on Persistent Organic Pollutants in 2009.

Production
PeCB can be produced as a byproduct of the manufacture of carbon tetrachloride and benzene.  It is extracted by distillation and crystallization. The direct production of pure PeCB is not practical because of the simultaneous production of other chlorinated compounds. Since PeCB is generally produced in small quantities in the chlorination of benzene, it is also contained in other chlorobenzenes (dichlorobenzenes, trichlorobenzenes etc.)

Today, a majority of the PeCB released into the environment is a result of backyard trash burning and municipal waste incineration.

Uses
PeCB was used as an intermediate in the manufacture of pesticides, particularly the fungicide pentachloronitrobenzene. Pentachloronitrobenzene is now made by
the chlorination of nitrobenzene in order to avoid the use of PeCB.

PeCB was a component of a mixture of chlorobenzenes added to products containing polychlorinated biphenyls in order to reduce viscosity.  PeCB has also been used as a fire retardant.

Safety and regulation
PeCB is a persistent organic pollutant, allowing an accumulation in the food chain. Consequently, pentachlorobenzene was added in 2009 to the list of chemical compounds covered by the Stockholm Convention, an international treaty which restricts the production and use of persistent organic pollutants.  PeCB has been banned in the European Union since 2002.

PeCB is very toxic to aquatic organisms, and decomposes on heating or on burning with the formation of toxic, corrosive fumes including hydrogen chloride. Combustion of PeCB may also result in the formation of polychlorinated dibenzodioxins ("dioxins") and polychlorinated dibenzofurans.

See also
Chlorobenzene
Dichlorobenzene
Trichlorobenzene
Hexachlorobenzene
Pentafluorobenzene
Pentachlorobenzenethiol

References

Chloroarenes
Persistent organic pollutants under the Stockholm Convention